Nasrapur is a village located  from Bhor Taluka in the Pune District of Maharashtra, India. Major nearby cities are Sasvad, Pune, Wai, and Pimpri-Chinchwad. The most commonly spoken language in Nasrapur is Marathi. Bhor and Pune are connected to Nasrapur by roads.

Schools 
 Shree Shivaji Vidyalaya Nasrapur
 Vijay Mukund Athavle Madhyamik Vidyalay Nasarapur
 Z.P School Nasarapur
 Amruta Vidyalaya

Engineering college 
 Navsahyadri college of Engineering Kelwade

Colleges 
 Shree Shivaji High-school Nasrapur

Economy 
The economy of the Nasrapur village revolves around agriculture, travel and tourism.

Teakwood Forest Resort and Camp Pune is an eco-friendly agro-tourism resort right next to Baneshwar Temple

See also 
Baneshwar Temple
 Waterfall 
Teakwood Forest Resort and Camp

References 

Villages in Pune district